"Visage" is the fourth single by the British pop group Visage, released by Polydor Records in July 1981. It is the title track from Visage's eponymous debut album. The single peaked at no.21 in the UK Singles Chart.

Cover and music video

In the UK, the single was available in three different covers, each featuring vocalist Steve Strange, by photographers John Timbers, Robyn Beeche and Brian Griffin.

The music video for the single was the first of two Visage videos directed by Midge Ure. The video includes footage shot at the Blitz nightclub in London's Covent Garden, which was the focal point of the New Romantic scene in the early 1980s. It was included on the Visage video album in 1986. A then-unknown Jacquie O'Sullivan (who would join Bananarama in the late 80's) appears briefly at the beginning of the video as one of The Blitz's customers on the bar counter.

Track listing
 7" single (1981)
A. "Visage" – 3:51
B. "Second Steps" – 5:00

 12" single (1981)
A. "Visage" (Dance Mix) – 6:01
B. "Second Steps" – 5:30

Personnel
Steve Strange – vocals
Midge Ure – guitar
Billy Currie – synthesizer, electric violin
John McGeoch – guitar
Rusty Egan – drums, electronic drums programming
Barry Adamson – bass
Dave Formula – synthesizer

Chart performance

References

1981 singles
Songs written by Midge Ure
Visage (band) songs
Songs written by Billy Currie
Songs written by Steve Strange
Songs written by Rusty Egan
Songs written by Dave Formula
1980 songs
Polydor Records singles